The Jojo Quest Bi is a Czech two-place paraglider that was designed and produced by Jojo Wings of Roudnice nad Labem. It is now out of production.

Design and development
The aircraft was designed as a tandem glider for flight training and as such was referred to as the Quest Bi, indicating "bi-place" or two seater.

The glider is AFNOR Biplace certified.

Operational history
Reviewer Noel Bertrand noted the very low price of the Quest Bi in a 2003 review, saying "the prices are very interesting".

Specifications (Quest Bi)

References

Quest Bi
Paragliders